RK Fēnikss is a Latvian rugby club based in Valmiera Municipality in the Vidzeme region of Latvia.

History
The club was founded in January 2005 as RK Kocēni.

External links
RK Fēnikss at draugiem.lv
RK Fēnikss at facebook.com

Latvian rugby union teams
Rugby clubs established in 2005
Valmiera Municipality
Vidzeme